Otradny (masculine), Otradnaya (feminine), or Otradnoye (neuter) may refer to:
Otradnoye District, a district in North-Eastern Administrative Okrug of the federal city of Moscow, Russia
Otradny, Russia (Otradnaya, Otradnoye), several inhabited localities in Russia
Otradnoye (Moscow Metro), a station on Serpukhovsko-Timiryazevskaya Line of Moscow Metro, Moscow, Russia
Otradnoye, former name of Qazanbatan, a village in Azerbaijan

See also
Otradnensky (disambiguation)
Vidradne (disambiguation)